Top Secret is the debut solo single album of Jun Hyoseong, a member of South Korean girl group Secret. The album was released on May 12, 2014 with the song "Good-night Kiss" serving as the lead track. The album contains three songs. The album was released with a limited and normal edition.

Release
On May 7, the music video teaser for the title song 'Goodnight Kiss' was released. The full music video was released on May 11, and the EP was released the day after.

Promotion
Jun Hyoseong promoted the single Goodnight Kiss, as well as Lonely Night in music shows in May 2014 on KBS's Music Bank, MBC's Show! Music Core, SBS's Inkigayo and Mnet's M! Countdown. She also held a MelOn showcase on the day of her album release.

Track listing

Charts

Album chart

Singles chart

Sales

Release history

References

External links
 Official website

2014 EPs
TS Entertainment albums
Single albums